Boundary Central Secondary is a public high school in Midway, British Columbia, located within the School District 51 Boundary.

High schools in British Columbia
Boundary Country
Educational institutions in Canada with year of establishment missing